Pulchrana siberu, also known as the Siberut Island frog, is a species of true frog, family Ranidae. It is found in the Mentawai Islands, off the Sumatran west coast (Indonesia), including the eponymous Siberut Island. It possibly occurs in Sumatra itself, although the latter records seem to refer to an as-yet-undescribed species. Similarly, earlier records from Malaysia refer to Pulchrana centropeninsularis.

It resembles the Pulchrana picturata, but can be distinguished by its continuous dorsolateral stripe, an immaculate dorsum without spots and the males lack nuptial pads.

Pulchrana siberu occurs in primary and secondary lowland forests at elevations below  in association with swamp and peat bog habitats. Breeding takes place in streams. It is threatened by habitat loss, which is primarily caused by expanding oil palm plantations.

References

siberu
Amphibians of Indonesia
Endemic fauna of Indonesia
Amphibians described in 1990